

Champions

Major League Baseball
World Series: Atlanta Braves over Cleveland Indians (4-2); Tom Glavine, MVP

All-Star Game, July 11 at The Ballpark in Arlington: National League, 3-2; Jeff Conine, MVP

Other champions
Caribbean World Series: Senadores de San Juan (Puerto Rico)
College World Series: Cal State-Fullerton
Cuban National Series: Villa Clara over Pinar del Río
Japan Series: Yakult Swallows over Orix BlueWave (4-1)
Korean Series: OB Bears over Lotte Giants
Big League World Series: Tainan, Taiwan
Junior League World Series: Lake Charles, Louisiana
Little League World Series: Shan-Hua, Tainan, Taiwan
Senior League World Series: Dunedin, Florida
Pan American Games: Cuba over Nicaragua
Taiwan Series: Uni-President Lions

Awards and honors
Baseball Hall of Fame
Richie Ashburn
Leon Day
William Hulbert
Mike Schmidt
Vic Willis
Most Valuable Player
Mo Vaughn (AL) Boston Red Sox
Barry Larkin (NL) Cincinnati Reds
Cy Young Award
Randy Johnson (AL) Seattle Mariners
Greg Maddux (NL) Atlanta Braves
Rookie of the Year
Marty Cordova (AL) Minnesota Twins
Hideo Nomo (NL) Los Angeles Dodgers
Manager of the Year Award
Lou Piniella (AL) Seattle Mariners
Don Baylor (NL) Colorado Rockies
Woman Executive of the Year (major or minor league): Mary Cain, Portland Rockies, Northwest League
Gold Glove Award
J. T. Snow (1B) California Angels (AL)
Roberto Alomar (2B) Toronto Blue Jays (AL)
Robin Ventura (3B) Chicago White Sox (AL)
Omar Vizquel (SS) Cleveland Indians (AL)
Ken Griffey Jr. (OF) Seattle Mariners (AL)
Kenny Lofton (OF) Cleveland Indians (AL)
Devon White (OF) Toronto Blue Jays (AL)
Iván Rodríguez (C) Texas Rangers (AL)
Mark Langston (P) California Angels (AL)
Mark Grace (1B) Chicago Cubs (NL)
Craig Biggio (2B) Houston Astros (NL)
Ken Caminiti (3B) San Diego Padres (NL)
Barry Larkin (SS) Cincinnati Reds (NL)
Steve Finley (OF) San Diego Padres (NL)
Marquis Grissom (OF) Atlanta Braves (NL)
Raúl Mondesí (OF) Los Angeles Dodgers (NL)
Charles Johnson (C) Florida Marlins (NL)
Greg Maddux (P) Atlanta Braves (NL)

MLB statistical leaders

Major League Baseball final standings
Note: All teams played 144 games instead of the normal 162 as a consequence of the 1994–95 Major League Baseball strike. Seattle and California each played 145 games due to a one game AL West tiebreaker.

 The asterisk denotes the club that won the wild card for its respective league.

Managers

American League

National League

Events

January–June
March 9 – Major League Baseball goes ahead with choosing the cities for the 1998 expansion: Phoenix, Arizona, and St. Petersburg, Florida.  Phoenix gets the National League Arizona Diamondbacks, and St. Petersburg gets the American League Tampa Bay Devil Rays.  To keep the leagues even-numbered, the Milwaukee Brewers switch to the National League after the 1997 season, giving the NL 16 teams and the AL 14 teams.
March 10 – Michael Jordan announces that he is leaving the Chicago White Sox organization and will return to the Chicago Bulls of the National Basketball Association.
April 2 – After 232 days, the 1994–95 MLBPA Players Strike comes to an end when judge Sonia Sotomayor ends the strike.
April 8 – The Colorado Rockies sign free agent outfielder Larry Walker.
April 25 – Major League Baseball begins its strike-shortened 144-game season.
April 26 – The Colorado Rockies open Coors Field with an 11-9 victory over the New York Mets in 14 innings.
May 26 – Ken Griffey Jr. of the Seattle Mariners fractures his left wrist while making a spectacular catch at the wall during the Mariners 8-3 victory over the Baltimore Orioles. Griffey would miss the next 73 games as a result of the injury.
May 28 – The Chicago White Sox (5) and Detroit Tigers (7) combine for a record 12 home runs in one game at Tiger Stadium.
June 3 – Pedro Martínez of the Montreal Expos pitches 9 perfect innings against the San Diego Padres before losing the perfect game on a 10th inning leadoff double by Bip Roberts as the Expos defeat the Padres 1-0 in 10 innings at Jack Murphy Stadium.
June 30:
Eddie Murray of the Cleveland Indians gets his 3,000th career hit in a 3-1 Cleveland win over the Minnesota Twins at the Metrodome.
Mark McGwire hits a walk-off grand slam in the ninth inning off closer Lee Smith to give the Oakland Athletics an 8–5 victory over the California Angels.

July–September
July 11 – The National League defeats the American League in the All-Star Game 3-2, on an 8th-inning pinch-hit home run by Jeff Conine. Conine becomes the 10th player to homer in his first All-Star at bat, and is named the Game's MVP. Frank Thomas, Craig Biggio and Mike Piazza also hit home runs.
July 14 – At Dodger Stadium, Ramón Martínez of the Los Angeles Dodgers no-hits the Florida Marlins 7-0. On June 3 of this same season, Martínez' brother Pedro, pitching for the Montréal Expos against the San Diego Padres at Qualcomm Stadium, pitches nine perfect innings only to have his bid for a perfect game broken up by a Bip Roberts single leading off the 10th. Otherwise the Martinezes are not the second brother combo, after Bob and Ken Forsch, to pitch Major League no-hitters, and they do not become the first to do so in the same season.
July 18 – Albert Belle of the Cleveland Indians becomes the second player to hit a walk-off grand slam against California Angels closer Lee Smith this season. Mark McGwire of the Oakland Athletics does that on June 30. The only other pitchers in major-league history to surrender two game-ending grand slams in one season are Satchel Paige and Lindy McDaniel. New York Mets closer Francisco Rodríguez joins this group during the  season.
July 30 – Mike Schmidt, Richie Ashburn, Vic Willis, William Hulbert and Leon Day are inducted into the National Baseball Hall of Fame in Cooperstown, New York.
August 10 – The Los Angeles Dodgers are forced to forfeit to the visiting St. Louis Cardinals when inebriated fans react to several close calls by throwing souvenir baseballs onto the field.
August 13 – New York Yankees Hall of Fame outfielder Mickey Mantle loses his battle with liver cancer and dies at the age of 63. He had undergone a liver transplant on June 8th. One of his last public appearances was at a news conference on July 11th in Dallas, the same day that the MLB All-Star Game that year was held in nearby Arlington, Texas. His funeral is held 2 days later with Bob Costas delivering the eulogy.
August 25 – The Philadelphia Phillies defeat the Los Angeles Dodgers 17-4 at Veterans Stadium. Hideo Nomo only pitches 3 innings.  Jeff Juden hits a grand slam in the 4th inning. Gregg Jefferies hits for the cycle, the first Phillie to do so since Johnny Callison in 1963.
August 29 – Against the Colorado Rockies at Three Rivers Stadium, Paul Wagner of the Pittsburgh Pirates has a no-hitter broken up by an Andrés Galarraga single with two out in the ninth. The hit is the only one Wagner allows in defeating the Rockies 4-0.
September 4 – Robin Ventura of the Chicago White Sox becomes the eighth player in major league history to hit two grand slams in a single game, doing so in the 4th and 5th innings of the White Sox 14-3 win over the Texas Rangers. The last to do it is Frank Robinson in 1970.
September 6 – Cal Ripken Jr. of the Baltimore Orioles plays in his 2,131st consecutive major league game to surpass Lou Gehrig's 56-year record. When the game becomes official in the middle of the fifth inning, Ripken takes a victory lap around Camden Yards during the 22-minute standing ovation from the sellout crowd, including President Bill Clinton. In the game, Ripken goes 2-for-4, including a home run, in Baltimore's 4-2 win over California. It is baseball's most memorable moment in the 1990s.
September 8 – The Cleveland Indians clinch the American League Central Division with a 3-2 win over the Baltimore Orioles.  It is Cleveland's first postseason appearance since 1954, and ends the then-longest post-season drought in the Major Leagues.
September 13 – Second baseman Lou Whitaker and shortstop Alan Trammell of the Detroit Tigers play in their 1,915th game together, setting an American League record.
September 15 – The St. Louis Cardinals' shortstop Ozzie Smith is a part of his 1,554th double play to establish a new Major League record, despite the Cardinals losing to the Los Angeles Dodgers, 7-6.
September 25 – In a 7-0 victory over the St. Louis Cardinals at Wrigley Field, Frank Castillo of the Chicago Cubs has a no-hitter broken up with two out in the ninth—by inches. Bernard Gilkey hits a line drive to right field and despite an all-out attempt by Sammy Sosa to make a diving catch, the ball falls in for a hit and eventually rolls to the wall for a triple, the Cardinals' lone hit of the game.
September 28 – Greg A. Harris of the Montreal Expos becomes the first major league pitcher since 1893 to pitch with both hands in one game. Harris faces four batters, two from his usual right side and two from the left, in the ninth inning of a 9–7 loss to the Cincinnati Reds.
September 30 – Albert Belle hits his 50th home run of the season, and becomes the first player in Major League history to collect 50 home runs and 50 doubles in a season.

October–December
October 2 – In a one-game playoff the Seattle Mariners beat the California Angels 9–1 at Seattle after finishing tied atop the AL West.
October 8 – After being down 2 games-to-zero in the best of 5 series to the New York Yankees, the Seattle Mariners complete a comeback, capped by the late inning heroics of Edgar Martínez, their designated hitter.  Forever known as "the double" in Mariner lore, Martinez strokes a breaking ball into left field, scoring Joey Cora and Ken Griffey Jr. in the bottom of the 11th to erase a 1 run deficit and win the game and the series.
October 23 – The St. Louis Cardinals hire Tony La Russa as their manager.
October 28 – In a pitchers' duel, the Atlanta Braves win Game 6 of the World Series 1-0, on a combined one-hitter by Tom Glavine and Mark Wohlers. David Justice's sixth-inning home run accounts for the game's only run. In winning, the Braves become the first team to win World Championships representing three different cities – Boston (1914), Milwaukee (1957) and Atlanta. Catcher Tony Peña's leadoff single in the 6th is Cleveland's only hit. Glavine is named Series MVP.
November 2 – The New York Yankees name Joe Torre as their new manager, replacing Buck Showalter.
November 9 – Los Angeles Dodgers pitcher Hideo Nomo is named National League Rookie of the Year, becoming the first Japanese player ever to win a Major League award. Nomo posts a 13-6 record with 236 strikeouts and a 2.54 ERA in  innings of work.
December 22:
Anheuser-Busch agrees to sell the St. Louis Cardinals for $150 million to an investment group that agrees to keep the team in St. Louis.
The Florida Marlins sign free agent pitcher Kevin Brown.
The Philadelphia Phillies sign free agent third baseman Todd Zeile.
The Boston Red Sox sign free agent pitcher Jamie Moyer.

Movies
Hank Aaron: Chasing the Dream (TV)
Past the Bleachers (TV)

Births

January
January 9 – Gabriel Moya
January 11 – J. P. Crawford
January 11 – Stephen Nogosek
January 11 – Nick Solak
January 13 – Jack Larsen
January 13 – Andre Scrubb
January 15 – Riley Smith
January 17 – Randy Dobnak
January 17 – Michael Hermosillo
January 17 – Joe Jiménez
January 17 – Yohander Méndez
January 17 – Dom Nunez
January 17 – Jhon Romero
January 21 – Zach Plesac
January 21 – Antonio Senzatela
January 23 – Yairo Muñoz
January 24 – Mark Contreras
January 25 – Wyatt Mills
January 27 – Matt Foster
January 27 – Bryan Reynolds
January 29 – Connor Brogdon

February
February 2 – Yunior Marte
February 3 – Anthony Bender
February 3 – Andrew Knizner
February 4 – Greg Weissert
February 5 – Caleb Hamilton
February 6 – Zack Collins
February 6 – Riley O'Brien
February 7 – Víctor Arano
February 7 – Roberto Osuna
February 8 – Jake Fishman
February 9 – Bruce Zimmermann
February 10 – Cal Quantrill
February 11 – Gregory Soto
February 12 – Parker Dunshee
February 14 – Abiatal Avelino
February 19 – Joel Kuhnel
February 21 – C. D. Pelham
February 21 – Kodi Whitley
February 22 – Germán Márquez
February 24 – Chance Sisco
February 28 – Randy Arozarena

March
March 1 – Adbert Alzolay
March 2 – Miguel Andújar
March 2 – Reese McGuire
March 3 – Zack Kelly
March 6 – Eduardo Paredes
March 7 – Nick Ciuffo
March 7 – Jason Delay
March 9 – Zack Burdi
March 10 – Luis Castillo
March 10 – Josh VanMeter
March 13 – Nicky Lopez
March 13 – Keegan Thompson
March 16 – Rowdy Tellez
March 21 – Anthony Kay
March 21 – Chadwick Tromp
March 23 – Isiah Kiner-Falefa
March 24 – Nate Mondou
March 28 – Will Smith
March 31 – Brent Honeywell Jr.
March 31 – David McKay

April
April 1 – Keegan Akin
April 3 – Jacob Nottingham
April 4 – Conner Greene
April 4 – Eduardo Jiménez
April 6 – Bennett Sousa
April 9 – Mac Sceroler
April 11 – Cavan Biggio
April 12 – Gabe Speier
April 13 – Anthony Castro
April 15 – Jesús Cruz
April 15 – Danny Jansen
April 17 – Kean Wong
April 18 – Jake Rogers
April 19 – Bryan Garcia
April 19 – Chas McCormick
April 25 – A. J. Puk
April 26 – Nomar Mazara
April 28 – Brett Martin
April 29 – Zach McKinstry
April 30 – Jesús Tinoco

May
May 1 – José Urquidy
May 3 – Elieser Hernández
May 3 – Ronald Herrera
May 3 – Austin Meadows
May 4 – Akeem Bostick
May 5 – Brian Serven
May 6 – Yohan Ramírez
May 6 – Matt Thaiss
May 9 – Tommy Edman
May 16 – Freddy Fermín
May 16 – Gabe Klobosits
May 19 – Ronnie Dawson
May 21 – José Alvarado
May 25 – Jake Fraley
May 25 – Michael King
May 26 – Roel Ramírez
May 27 – Yoan Moncada
May 29 – Conner Menez
May 29 – Zack Short
May 30 – Christian Arroyo
May 30 – Iván Castillo
May 30 – Sterling Sharp
May 31 – Gerson Bautista
May 31 – Shane Bieber
May 31 – Greg Deichmann

June
June 1 – Jordan Sheffield
June 2 – Mickey McDonald
June 3 – Eric Lauer
June 5 – Phoenix Sanders
June 6 – Will Vest
June 8 – Chad Smith
June 10 – Patrick Murphy
June 12 – Aaron Civale
June 12 – Jeremy Walker
June 15 – Dominic Smith
June 16 – Ian Hamilton
June 16 – Tyler Zuber
June 19 – Cody Sedlock
June 20 – Félix Bautista
June 22 – Matthew Batten
June 22 – Tyler O'Neill
June 23 – Jorge Mateo
June 25 – Franklyn Kilome
June 27 – Jonah Heim
June 29 – Bobby Dalbec
June 29 – Nick Senzel

July
July 1 – Ron Marinaccio
July 3 – Robert Dugger
July 5 – Austin Hays
July 7 – Richard Lovelady
July 7 – Nathaniel Lowe
July 7 – Franmil Reyes
July 8 – Sam Long
July 9 – Kenny Rosenberg
July 9 – Jared Young
July 10 – Phil Bickford
July 11 – Daniel Johnson
July 11 – Justin Steele
July 12 – Narciso Crook
July 12 – Bailey Ober
July 13 – Cody Bellinger
July 13 – Alec Bettinger
July 13 – Kyle Lewis
July 14 – Isaac Mattson
July 20 – Jake Walsh
July 22 – José Siri
July 25 – Darick Hall
July 26 – Paul Campbell
July 27 – Foster Griffin
July 27 – Brad Keller
July 27 – Adalberto Mondesí
July 27 – Drew Rasmussen
July 28 – Jorge Alcalá
July 28 – Tylor Megill
July 29 – Tyson Miller
July 30 – Josh Palacios

August
August 1 – T. J. Zeuch
August 2 – Daulton Jefferies
August 3 – Zac Gallen
August 8 – Tomoya Mori
August 10 – Monte Harrison
August 11 – Michael Chavis
August 14 – TJ Friedl
August 14 – Stephen Ridings
August 17 – Blake Taylor
August 18 – Yu Chang
August 20 – Brian Miller
August 20 – Justin Williams
August 21 – Ryan Dorow
August 21 – Tyler Johnson
August 22 – Shed Long
August 23 – Bernardo Flores
August 23 – Lane Thomas
August 23 – Carlos Tocci
August 24 – Brandon Wagner
August 26 – Ranger Suárez
August 29 – José Rodríguez
August 30 – Sean Reid-Foley

September
September 1 – Eduard Bazardo
September 2 – Willy Adames
September 3 – David Peterson
September 4 – Mark Kolozsvary
September 5 – Jason Martin
September 7 – Sandy Alcántara
September 7 – Devin Smeltzer
September 8 – Drew Carlton
September 10 – Mike Baumann
September 10 – Luis González
September 11 – Domingo Leyba
September 14 – Kazuto Taguchi
September 18 – Vladimir Gutiérrez
September 20 – Cory Abbott
September 20 – Joe Dunand
September 20 – Jon Kennedy
September 22 – Justin Dunn
September 22 – Calvin Faucher
September 22 – James Karinchak
September 22 – Luis Ortiz
September 22 – Taisuke Yamaoka
September 25 – Javy Guerra
September 26 – Albert Abreu
September 28 – Joe Barlow
September 28 – Enoli Paredes

October
October 1 – Charlie Barnes
October 2 – Alex Lange
October 2 – Kyle Wright
October 5 – Zack Littell
October 6 – Jake Bauers
October 8 – Colin Holderman
October 9 – Merandy González
October 10 – Collin Snider
October 10 – Nick Snyder
October 10 – Nick Vespi
October 12 – Kirk McCarty
October 13 – Andrew Wantz
October 15 – Jack Flaherty
October 17 – Ha-seong Kim
October 24 – Nick Gordon
October 27 – Bryce Johnson
October 27 – Francisco Mejía
October 30 – Yuki Matsui
October 31 – Miles Mastrobuoni

November
November 1 – Jason Foley
November 2 – Rei Takahashi
November 9 – José Quijada
November 12 – Alex Faedo
November 14 – J. J. Matijevic
November 15 – Luis Barrera
November 16 – Victor González
November 20 – Jeremy Beasley
November 20 – Amed Rosario
November 20 – Forrest Wall
November 22 – Stone Garrett
November 22 – Parker Mushinski
November 23 – Lewis Thorpe
November 24 – Francis Martes
November 25 – Trevor Stephan
November 27 – Jared Oliva

December
December 1 – Drew Ellis
December 1 – Brandon Hughes
December 4 – Jake Bird
December 5 – Julián Fernández
December 5 – Nick Nelson
December 6 – Allen Córdoba
December 12 – DJ Peters
December 18 – Luis Liberato
December 18 – Brendan McKay
December 23 – Dalton Guthrie
December 25 – Enyel De Los Santos
December 25 – Alex Jackson
December 27 – Jonah Bride
December 28 – Dylan Cease
December 28 – Corbin Martin
December 29 – Sean Guenther
December 30 – Derek Hill

Deaths

January
January   2 – Don Elston, 65, two-time All-Star relief pitcher who played for the Chicago Cubs and  Brooklyn Dodgers during nine seasons spanning 1953–1964, heading the National League with 69 relief appearances in 1958 and 65 in 1959 and leading all relievers with 127 innings pitched in 1960.
January   3 – Ollie Bejma, 87, middle infielder and third baseman for the Chicago White Sox and St. Louis Browns in a span of four seasons between 1934 and 1939.
January   3 – Bob Darnell, 64, pitcher who played for the Brooklyn Dodgers during the 1954 and 1956 seasons.
January   3 – Mickey Haefner, 82, left-handed pitcher who played from 1943 through 1950 for the Washington Senators, Chicago White Sox and Boston Braves; one of four knuckleballers who were regular starting pitchers for 1945 Senators.
January   3 – Jim Tyack, 83, outfielder for the 1943 Philadelphia Athletics.
January   4 – Harry Gumbert, 85, pitcher who played with four clubs during 15 seasons from  1935–1950, going 11–3 in 1936 and winning 10 in 1937 for the New York Giants, helping them win back-to-back National League pennant winners, then going 9–5 to help the St. Louis Cardinals clinch the NL pennant in 1942 and 10-5 a year later, en route to the 1942 World Series which the Cardinals beat the New York Yankees, 4 games to 1.
January   4 – Ralph Onis, 86, catcher for the 1935 Brooklyn Dodgers.
January   7 – Kite Thomas, 71, outfielder who played from 1952 to 1953 for the Philadelphia Athletics and Washington Senators.
January 12 – Hi Simmons, 89, head baseball coach at the University of Missouri from 1937 through 1973, guiding his team to the 1954 College World Series title.
January 17 – John Hall, 71, pitcher for the 1948 Brooklyn Dodgers.
January 18 – Ron Luciano, 57, American League umpire from 1968 to 1980 known for his flamboyance and as the author of humorous books on the life of an MLB umpire.
January 20 – Mark Filley, 82, pitcher for the 1934 Washington Senators.
January 21 – Russ Bauers, 80, pitcher for the Pittsburgh Pirates, Chicago Cubs and St. Louis Browns over eight seasons between 1936 and 1950.
January 23 – Saul Rogovin, 72, pitcher for the Detroit Tigers, Chicago White Sox, Baltimore Orioles and Philadelphia Phillies in a span of eight seasons from 1949–1957; led the American League with a 2.78 ERA in 1951.
January 24 – Herb Karpel, 77, pitcher for the 1946 New York Yankees.
January 26 – Dick Tettelbach, 65, outfielder who played from 1955 through 1957 for the New York Yankees and Washington Senators.
January 30 – Buddy Gremp, 75, first baseman for the Boston Braves from 1940 to 1942.

February
February   6 – Elmer Burkart, 78, pitcher who appeared in 16 games over four brief trials with the Philadelphia Phillies from 1936 to 1939.
February   7 – Cecil Upshaw, 52, right-handed reliever who played for five teams during nine seasons from 1966–1975, saving 27 games for the Atlanta Braves in 1969, well known for his unorthodox but effective submarine delivery, as he tore up the ring finger on his pitching hand and had at least two surgeries and rehabbing.
February 24 – Woody Williams, 82, second baseman for the Brooklyn Dodgers and Cincinnati Reds during four seasons spanning 1938 to 1945, appearing in 338 career games.
February 28 – Wally Millies, 88, backup catcher for the Philadelphia Phillies, Washington Senators and Brooklyn Dodgers in a span of six seasons between 1934 and 1941.

March
March   2 – Ray Moore, 68, pitcher who played for the Brooklyn Dodgers, Baltimore Orioles, Chicago White Sox, Washington Senators and Minnesota Twins over 11 seasons from 1952 to 1963.
March   5 – Roy Hughes, 84, middle infielder and third baseman for four teams over nine seasons from 1935–1946, who delivered 188 hits and scored 112 runs for the 1936 Cleveland Indians; starting shortstop for Chicago Cubs in six of seven games of 1945 World Series, batting .294.
March 11 – Don Manno, 79, left fielder and third baseman for the Boston Bees and Braves from 1940 to 1941.
March 13 – Leon Day, 78, seven-time All-Star pitcher for the Newark Eagles of the Negro leagues, who set several league strikeout marks, including 18 victims in one game, and was enshrined into the Baseball Hall of Fame just six days before his death.
March 14 – Charlie Letchas, 79, backup infielder who played for the Philadelphia Phillies and Washington Senators in a span of four seasons from 1939–1946.
March 17 – Muriel Kauffman, 78, philanthropist and civic leader who, with her husband, Ewing, founded the Kansas City Royals in 1968 and operated the team for over 25 years.
March 17 – Jimmy Uchrinscko, 94, pitcher for the 1927 Washington Senators.
March 27 – Chet Nichols, 64, pitcher for the Boston and Milwaukee Braves, Boston Red Sox and Cincinnati Reds during nine seasons between 1951 and 1964, who posted 10 wins and led the National League with a 2.88 ERA in his rookie season.

April
April   7 – Frank Secory, 82, National League umpire from 1952 to 1970 who worked in four World Series, six All-Star Games and nine no-hitters; previously an outfielder for three MLB clubs between 1940 and 1946, well known for a pivotal hit in the 1945 World Series as a Chicago Cub.
April   9 – Bob Allison, 60, All-Star outfielder for the Washington Senators and Minnesota Twins (1958–1970), who earned the 1959 American League Rookie of the Year award, had three 30-home run seasons, and led the league in triples and runs once each.
April 10 – Billy Myers, 84, shortstop who played with the Cincinnati Reds from 1935 to 1940 and for the Chicago Cubs in 1941, being a member of the National League champion Reds in 1939 and 1940, and best remembered for his 1940 World Series-winning sacrifice fly in Game 7 against the Detroit Tigers.
April 13 – Hal Peck, 77, right fielder who played from 1943 to 1949 for the Brooklyn Dodgers, Philadelphia Athletics and Cleveland Indians, and also was a member of the 1948 World Series champion Indians.
April 18 – Elizabeth Emry, 72, All-American Girls Professional Baseball League pitcher for the 1946 Racine Belles champion team.
April 19 – Jack Wilson, 83, pitcher who played from 1934 through 1942 with the Boston Red Sox, Philadelphia Athletics, Washington Senators and Detroit Tigers.
April 23 – Howard Cosell, 77, flamboyant and controversial sportscaster whose many assignments included acting as color commentator for the World Series and League Championship Series for ABC Television during the 1970s.
April 23 – Jake Daniel, 85, first baseman for the 1937 Brooklyn Dodgers.
April 24 – John Campbell, 87, pitcher for the Washington Senators in the 1933 season.
April 27 – Kent Peterson, 69, pitcher who played for the Cincinnati Reds and Philadelphia Phillies in all or part of eight seasons spanning 1944–1953.
April 28 – Peaches Davis, 89, pitcher who played from 1936 to 1939 for the Cincinnati Reds.
April 28 – Gustavo Polidor, 33, Venezuelan infielder for the California Angels, Milwaukee Brewers and Florida Marlins during seven seasons between 1985 and 1993.
April 29 – Ray Prim, 88, pitcher for the Washington Senators, Philadelphia Phillies and Chicago Cubs in a span of six seasons from 1933–1946; one of many ballplayers whose career was interrupted during World War II, who posted a 13-8 record and led National League pitchers with a 2.40 ERA for the pennant winning Cubs in 1945.

May
May   4 – Connie Wisniewski, 73, four-time All-American Girls Professional Baseball League All-Star pitcher and outfielder, who set several records in the circuit in a nine-year career from 1944 through 1952.
May   7 – Gus Bell, 66, All-Star outfielder, mainly with the Cincinnati Reds, who had four 100-RBI seasons, led the National League in triples in 1951, and was the oldest in a Major League family that includes his son Buddy and his grandsons David and Mike.
May   9 – Marguerite Jones, 77, Canadian pitcher who played for the Minneapolis Millerettes and Rockford Peaches of the All-American Girls Professional Baseball League.
May 17 – George "Catfish" Metkovich, 74, outfielder and first baseman who played for the Boston Red Sox, Cleveland Indians, Chicago White Sox, Pittsburgh Pirates, Chicago Cubs and Milwaukee Braves in a span of ten seasons from 1943–1954.
May 18 – Jack Kramer, 77, three-time All-Star pitcher, whose 17 victories and 2.49 earned run average helped lead the St. Louis Browns to their only World Series appearance in 1944; later, an 18-game-winner for 1948 Boston Red Sox.
May 19 – Fred Frink, 83. outfielder for the 1934 Philadelphia Phillies.
May 23 – Ab Wright, 89, outfielder who played with the Cleveland Indians in the 1935 season and for the Boston Braves in 1944.
May 30 – Glenn Burke, 42, center fielder for the Los Angeles Dodgers and Oakland Athletics in four seasons from 1978–1979, who was the first player in Major League history to publicly acknowledge his homosexuality during his professional career.
May 31 – Norm Brown, 76, pitcher who played for the Philadelphia Athletics in the 1943 and 1946 seasons.

June
June   7 – Eddie Lake, 79, middle infielder and third baseman who played for the St. Louis Cardinals, Boston Red Sox and Detroit Tigers during eleven seasons spanning 1939–1950.
June   9 – Zoilo Versalles, 55, Cuban two-time All-Star and two-time Gold Glove shortstop who led the Minnesota Twins to the 1965 American League pennant, as well as the first Latin American player to win the Most Valuable Player Award, while leading the league in triples three times and in doubles and runs once each.
June 10 – Stan Andrews, 78, backup catcher who played for the Boston Bees, Brooklyn Dodgers and Philadelphia Phillies. in a span of four seasons from 1939–1945.
June 10 – Lindsey Nelson, 76, broadcaster for the New York Mets from 1962 to 1979, and later for the San Francisco Giants and CBS Radio.
June 17 – Bruce Campbell, 85, right fielder for five clubs during 13 seasons from 1930–1942, who returned from a bout with spinal meningitis in 1936 while playing for the Cleveland Indians, to get six hits in a nine-inning ball game and reach a .372 average in 172 at-bats, appearing also in all seven games of the 1940 World Series with the Detroit Tigers, posting a batting line of .360/.448/.520 with one home run and six RBI, while batting sixth in the line-up behind Charlie Gehringer, Hank Greenberg and Rudy York.

July
July   4 – Adeline Kerrar, 70,  All-American Girls Professional Baseball League catcher and infielder.
July   4 – Al Unser, 82, backup catcher who played with the Detroit Tigers from 1942 to 1944 and for the Cincinnati Reds 1945; one of many ballplayers who only appeared in the major leagues during World War II; father of Del Unser and longtime scout.
July 17 – Herb Hippauf, 56, relief pitcher for the 1966 Atlanta Braves who became a longtime scout.
July 27 – Rick Ferrell, 89, Hall of Fame and eight-time All-Star catcher who played for the St. Louis Browns, Boston Red Sox and Washington Senators from 1929–1947, whose 1,806 career-games caught were an American League record until 1988; batterymate of his brother Wes Ferrell with the Red Sox from 1934 through 1938; later a coach for Washington and the Detroit Tigers, and a longtime Tiger front-office executive.

August
August   1 – Ruby Knezovich, 77, Canadian catcher who played from 1943 to 1944 in the All-American Girls Professional Baseball League.
August   3 – Harry Craft, 80, manager of the Houston Colt .45s in their 1962 debut, who also managed the Kansas City Athletics and Chicago Cubs, and previously was a Cincinnati Reds center fielder.
August   4 – Dick Bartell, 87, All-Star shortstop for five teams, known for his combative personality, who batted .300 five times and scored 100 runs three times, while batting .381 for the New York Giants in the 1936 World Series.
August 13 – Mickey Mantle, 63, Hall of Fame and 16-time All-Star center fielder, as well as a powerful switch-hitter for the New York Yankees, being a successor to Babe Ruth and Joe DiMaggio as symbol of the Yankees' long reign, who earned the American League MVP Award from 1956–1957 and in 1962, while setting a record with 18 home runs in World Series play, hitting .300 or more ten times, leading the AL in runs six times to set an all-time record, winning the 1956 Triple Crown, four home run titles –hitting 50 twice–, and retiring with the third most career HRs (536) and walks (1,733) in MLB history, including career marks for runs (1,677), RBI (1,509) and slugging percentage (.557).
August 20 – Bill Kennedy, 76, pitcher who played for the Washington Senators in a span of three seasons from 1942–1947. 
August 20 – Von McDaniel, 56, pitcher who joined his elder brother Lindy on the 1957–1958 St. Louis Cardinals pitching staff, throwing a complete game, two-hit shutout for St. Louis in his debut against the defending National League champion Brooklyn Dodgers in 1957, winning his first four decisions, including 19 consecutive scoreless innings and a one-hitter; a breakdown in his pitching mechanics resulted in severe control problems that curtailed his promising pitching career, and caused him to eventually become a third baseman in the minor leagues.
August 28 – Juan Rios, 53, Puerto Rican middle infielder who played for the Kansas City Royals in its 1969 inaugural season.

September
September   7 – Al Papai, 78, knuckleballer specialist for four major league teams from 1948–1955, and one of 29 players to pitch for the St. Louis Browns and Cardinals clubs.
September 15 – Napoleón Reyes, 75, Cuban corner infielder for the New York Giants in part of three seasons spanning 1943–1950, who tied a National League record for the most hit by pitches in a season, being hit on eight occasions in 1945, joining Hall of Famer Mel Ott and All-Star center outfielder Andy Pafko.
September 19 – Mem Lovett, 83, who appeared as a pinch-hitter in a single game with the Chicago White Sox in the 1933 season.
September 21 – Tony Cuccinello, 87, three-time All-Star second baseman and third baseman for five teams during 15 seasons spanning 1930–1945, who led National League second basemen in assists and double plays three times and hit .300 or better five times, with a career high .315 in 1931; hit .308 in 1945, losing the American League batting title in the last day of the season by .001 to Snuffy Stirnweiss; later, spent two decades as a third-base coach for four clubs, including 1968 world champion Detroit Tigers. 
September 21 – Andrew Rozdilsky, 77, who performed as Andy the Clown at Chicago White Sox games from 1960 to 1990.

October
October   3 – Nippy Jones, 70, backup first baseman for the St. Louis Cardinals, Philadelphia Phillies and Milwaukee Braves in eight seasons between 1946 and 1957, who made a token appearance as a pinch hitter in the 1946 World Series, won by the Cardinals, whose last time at bat in his undistinguished career earned him enduring fame in a memorable shoe-polish incident that helped the Braves win Game 4 of the 1957 World Series en route to the world championship.
October 10 – Ed Gill, 100, pitcher for the 1919 Washington Senators.
October 15 – Thelma Griffith Haynes, 82, who shared majority ownership of the Washington Senators/Minnesota Twins with her older brother, Calvin Griffith, from 1955 through 1984.
October 16 – Joe Szekely, 70, right fielder who played with the Cincinnati Redlegs in its 1953 season. 
October 21 – Vada Pinson, 57, three-time All-Star and Gold Glove center fielder, who spent his 18-year career with five clubs from 1958 through 1975, most prominently with the Cincinnati Reds, leading the National League in hits, doubles and triples twice each, including four 200-hit seasons, while ending his career with 2,757 hits, 256 home runs and 305 stolen bases.
October 26 – Lyman Linde, 75, pitcher for the Cleveland Indians during two seasons from 1947 to 1948. 
October 29 – Al Niemiec, 84, second baseman who played with the Boston Red Sox in the 1934 season and for the Philadelphia Athletics in 1936.
October 31 – Jim Campbell, 71, longtime Detroit Tigers executive; as general manager (1962–1983) and club president (1983–1992) he played a major role in Tigers' 1968 and 1984 World Series championships.

November
November   2 – Sal Gliatto, 93, pitcher for the 1930 Cleveland Indians.
November 19 – Ed Wright, 76, pitcher for the Boston Braves and Philadelphia Athletics between 1945 and 1952, who also threw a no-hitter in the American Association in 1945 and hurled the first shutout in Caribbean Series history in 1949.
November 22 – Art Smith, 89, pitcher who played for the Chicago White Sox in 1932.
November 23 – Lee Rogers, 82, pitcher who played  for the Boston Red Sox and Brooklyn Dodgers during the 1938 season.
November 24 – Irene Hickson, 80, All-Star catcher who played in the All-American Girls Professional Baseball League in a span of nine seasons from 1943–1950, winning the batting title in 1943 and being a member of two championship teams in 1943 and 1946.
November 30 – Jim Davis, 69, pitcher for the Chicago Cubs, St. Louis Cardinals and New York Giants from 1954 to 1957, who in 1956 became the first pitcher in 40 years to record four strikeouts in a single inning.
November 30 – William Suero, 29, Dominican Republic infielder for the Milwaukee Brewers from 1992 to 1993.

December
December   2 – Art Herring, 89, pitcher who played for the Detroit Tigers, Brooklyn Dodgers, Chicago White Sox and Pittsburgh Pirates during eleven seasons spanning 1929–1947.
December   5 – Bill Bruton, 70, speedy center fielder for the Milwaukee Braves and Detroit Tigers over 12 seasons from 1953 to 1964; led the National League in stolen bases three times, triples twice and runs once; a member of Braves teams that won two NL pennants (1957–1958) and the 1957 World Series; tied an MLB record with two bases-loaded triples in one game (August 2, 1959). 
December 11 – Woody Wheaton, 81, two-way outfielder / pitcher for the Philadelphia Athletics in two seasons from 1943–1944.
December 12 – Mike Modak, 73, pitcher for the 1945 Cincinnati Reds.
December 15 – Paul Pryor, 68, National League umpire (1961 to 1981) who worked three World Series, three All-Star games, and 3,094 NL tilts.
December 17 – George Cox, 91, pitcher who played for the Chicago White Sox in 1928. 
December 20 – Betty Wanless, 67, All-American Girls Professional Baseball League infielder.
December 27 – Al Barlick, 80, Hall of Fame umpire for 28 National League seasons between 1940 and 1971, who officiated seven World Series and an MLB record seven All-Star Games.
December 26 – Bob Veselic, 40, relief pitcher for the Minnesota Twins in the 1980 and 1981 seasons.
December 27 – Oscar Judd, 87, left-handed pitcher who played from 1941 through 1948 for the Boston Red Sox and Philadelphia Phillies; American League All-Star (1943); member of the Canadian Baseball Hall of Fame.

Sources

External links

Major League Baseball official website 
Minor League Baseball official website 
Baseball Almanac – Major League Baseball Players Who Died in 1995